Hal Reed was an American  football coach.  He was the second head football coach at the University of Missouri in Columbia, Missouri, serving for one season, in 1891, and compiling a record of 3–1.

Head coaching record

References

Year of birth missing
Year of death missing
Missouri Tigers football coaches